Senator Stoddard may refer to:

Ebenezer Stoddard (1785–1847), Connecticut State Senate
Elijah B. Stoddard (1827–1903), Massachusetts State Senate